Stefan Potocki (ca. 1624 – 19 May 1648 near Tawań) was a Polish nobleman, starosta (tenant of the Crown lands) of Niżyn.

Family 
Stefan Potocki was member of the Potocki family. He was a son of Mikołaj Potocki and his first wife Zofia Firlej.

He was single.

Life 
In the Battle of Zhovti Vody Stefan Potocki was wounded, taken prisoner of war and died from gangrene on May 19, 1648.

Legacy 
Julian Ursyn Niemcewicz wrote Duma o Stefanie Potockim. Stefan Potocki was portrayed by Henryk Sienkiewicz in With Fire and Sword (1884).

References

1620s births
1648 deaths
Military personnel of the Polish–Lithuanian Commonwealth
Stefan
Polish prisoners of war
Polish people who died in prison custody
Deaths from gangrene
Polish military personnel of the Khmelnytsky Uprising